Belno may refer to the following places:
Belno, Kuyavian-Pomeranian Voivodeship (north-central Poland)
Belno, Gmina Bieliny in Świętokrzyskie Voivodeship (south-central Poland)
Belno, Gmina Zagnańsk in Świętokrzyskie Voivodeship (south-central Poland)
Belno, Masovian Voivodeship (east-central Poland)